Rising from Ashes may refer to:

 Rising from Ashes (film), 2012 documentary film about Rwanda's national cycling team
 Rising from Ashes (album), 2013 Silent Force album